The Old Colony Cove Site is an archaeological site near Rose Haven in Anne Arundel County, Maryland.

It was listed on the National Register of Historic Places in 1978.

References

External links
, including photo from 1977, at Maryland Historical Trust

Archaeological sites in Anne Arundel County, Maryland
Archaeological sites on the National Register of Historic Places in Maryland
Shell middens in the United States
Native American history of Maryland
Woodland period
National Register of Historic Places in Anne Arundel County, Maryland